Enshō-ji may refer to:

 , a Buddhist temple complex in Kyoto, Japan founded by Imperial consort Taikenmon'in in 1128.
 , a Buddhist temple complex in Kyoto founded by Emperor Konoe in 1149.
 , a Buddhist temple complex in Nara founded by Queen Bunchi, consort of Emperor Go-Mizunoo, in 1656.